Kartul may refer to:
 Kartul, Hamadan
 Kartul, Lorestan